In enzymology, a streptomycin 6-kinase is an enzyme that catalyzes the chemical reaction

ATP + streptomycin  ADP + streptomycin 6-phosphate

Thus, the two substrates of this enzyme are ATP and streptomycin, whereas its two products are ADP and streptomycin 6-phosphate.

This enzyme belongs to the family of transferases, specifically those transferring phosphorus-containing groups (phosphotransferases) with an alcohol group as acceptor.  The systematic name of this enzyme class is ATP:streptomycin 6-phosphotransferase. Other names in common use include streptidine kinase, SM 6-kinase, streptomycin 6-kinase (phosphorylating), streptidine kinase (phosphorylating), streptomycin 6-O-phosphotransferase, and streptomycin 6-phosphotransferase.  This enzyme participates in streptomycin biosynthesis.

References

 
 

EC 2.7.1
Enzymes of unknown structure